The International Institute for Asian Studies (IIAS) is a global research institute and knowledge exchange platform, based in Leiden, the Netherlands. The Institute initiates and promotes interdisciplinary and trans-sectoral programmes that engage partners in Asia as well as institutes elsewhere in the world. So doing, the Institute aims to promote a more integrated understanding of present-day Asian realities as well as to pioneer new approaches to Asian Studies in a changing global context, and, more specifically, to contribute to new humanistically-informed and policy-relevant knowledge about Asia.

Establishment
The International Institute for Asian Studies was established in 1993, following recommendations by two successive committees, installed by the Dutch Ministry of Education and Science (1989) and the Royal Netherlands Academy of Arts and Sciences (KNAW).

The city of Leiden was only a logical choice for the Institute’s headquarters. Leiden is home to many institutes with expertise and resources about Asia, including Leiden University, the Royal Netherlands Institute of Southeast Asian and Caribbean Studies (KITLV), the Siebold House Japan Museum, the Netherlands Institute for the Near East (NINO), the National Museum of Ethnology and the National Museum of Antiquities.

The International Institute for Asian Studies was, and still is, hosted by Leiden University, which provides office space as well as administrative and IT services. From 1997 to 2012, IIAS also had a branch office in Amsterdam, facilitated by the University of Amsterdam.

IIAS receives its core funding from the Ministry of Education. The Institute additionally generates income from external sources, via grants, subsidies, and the joint execution of programmes.

While upholding its original mission, the Institute has over the years adapted and expanded its programmatic agenda in response to the demands of a changing global context.

Activities
Activities include multi-year research programmes and the building of academic networks, the organisation of international conferences and roundtables, a fellowship and a publication programme, PhD in-situ masterclasses, and the publication of a free periodical on Asian Studies (titled, The Newsletter).

The following current programmes and networks are among the Institute's main initiatives:

 Urban Knowledge Network Asia (UKNA)
 Southeast Asia Neighborhoods Network (SEANNET)
 Humanities across Borders: Asia-Africa in the World
 Asia-Africa, A new Axis of Knowledge
 Leiden Centre for the Indian Ocean Studies
 International Convention of Asia Scholars (ICAS)
 European Alliance for Asian Studies 
Critical Heritage Studies of Asia and Europe

References

External links
https://www.iias.asia

Asian studies
Research institutes in the Netherlands